Lieutenant-General Sir Gordon Nevil Macready, 2nd Baronet  (5 April 1891 – 17 October 1956) was a British Army officer who served as Assistant Chief of the Imperial General Staff during the Second World War.

Military career

Born in Kandy, British Ceylon, on 5 April 1891, the son of Sir Nevil Macready, Gordon Macready was sent to England and was educated at Cheltenham College and later entered the Royal Military Academy, Woolwich and was commissioned as a second lieutenant into the Royal Engineers on 23 December 1910. Promoted to lieutenant on 21 December 1912, Macready served on the Western Front during the First World War becoming Assistant Adjutant & Quartermaster General (AA&QMG) for the 66th (2nd East Lancashire) Division in 1917. He was promoted to captain on 23 December 1916, and brevet major on 3 June 1917. After the war, from April 1919, he became Assistant Adjutant General for the British Military Mission to Berlin.

Attending the Staff College, Camberley from 1923 to 1924, he was appointed Assistant Secretary to the Committee of Imperial Defence in 1926, which was followed by attendance at the Imperial Defence College in 1933, Deputy Director of Staff Duties at the War Office in 1936 and Head of the British Military Mission to Egypt in 1938.

He served in the Second World War as Assistant Chief of the Imperial General Staff from October 1940 and as Head of the British Army mission in Washington D. C. from 1942 until his retirement in 1946.

In retirement he became Regional Commissioner for Lower Saxony in 1946, British Chairman of the Economic Control Office for the British and American Zones of Germany in 1947 and then Economic Advisor to the UK High Commissioner in 1949.

He is author of the book In the wake of the great published by Clowes in 1965.

Family
In 1920 he married Elisabeth Pauline Sabine Marie de Noailles; they had one son, Sir Nevil Macready, 3rd Bt.

Arms

References

Bibliography

External links
British Army Officers 1939−1945
Generals of World War II

|-

 

1891 births
1956 deaths
People from British Ceylon
Graduates of the Royal College of Defence Studies
Baronets in the Baronetage of the United Kingdom
British Army generals of World War II
British Army personnel of World War I
Commanders of the Legion of Merit
Companions of the Distinguished Service Order
Companions of the Order of St Michael and St George
Companions of the Order of the Bath
Graduates of the Royal Military Academy, Woolwich
Graduates of the Staff College, Camberley
Grand Officers of the Order of Orange-Nassau
Knights Commander of the Order of the British Empire
Recipients of the Legion of Honour
People educated at Cheltenham College
People from Kandy
Recipients of the Military Cross
Royal Engineers officers
War Office personnel in World War II